Sweet Lorraine is a 1987 American film directed by Steve Gomer in his directorial debut. The film draws from Gomer's adolescent experiences at the Heiden Hotel in the Catskills.

Plot 
During summer, Molly Garber meets her grandmother Lillian at the Lorraine, a Catskills resort that appears to be nearing the end of its days. Owned by Lillian, The Lorraine, once the crown jewel of the Borscht Belt, is now dilapidated, staffed by a number of rambunctious kids, and barely held together by a single handyman. The hotel is being pursued by developers and the returning clientele comes to stay more out more out of nostalgia than anything.

The film follows Molly's camaraderie with the staff and the bond she has with her grandmother, her affair with the hotel's sole handyman, and her subsequent determination to rescue the Lorraine from being sold.

Cast 
 Maureen Stapleton as Lillian Garber
 Trini Alvarado as Molly
 Lee Richardson as Sam
 John Bedford Lloyd as Jack 
 Freddie Roman as Phil Allen
 Giancarlo Esposito as Howie 
 Edith Falco as Karen
 Todd Graff as Leonard
 Evan Handler as Bobby
 Tamara Tunie as Julie

Production 
Sweet Lorraine was shot at the Heiden Hotel before it was demolished.

Reception

Critical reception 
Michael Wilmington of the Los Angeles Times stated that at times the story got "as threadbare as the Lorraine", but pointed out that its sincerity and the "affection that inspired it" carried the film.

In a review for The New York Times, Janet Maslin stated that the film lacked "polish and momentum" but that it had a "cheerful, good-natured feeling". She described Sweet Lorraine as a "a friendly, agreeably aimless portrait of the Heiden".

Larry Kart of the Chicago Tribune gave Sweet Lorraine a less than favorable review. He described the film as a "lukewarm cinematic blintz" and as "aggressively nice and rather bland" compared to Dirty Dancing, a romantic drama also set in a Catskills resort and released that same year. Kart criticized the film's pace, stating that the Sweet Lorraine was hampered by " a lack of dramatic heat" and that "not enough happens to make it more than a moderately pleasant way to pass the time". A few of the "odd" casting choices were also criticized, due to the not being Jewish despite the film's "explicitly Jewish" atmosphere. Kart concluded his review by praising Freddie Roman's performance, and by stating that Gomer's "low-key approach gives the film the feel of an anecdote that has been mounted for public television, not theatrical release".

In his book American Jewish Films: The Search for Identity, Lawrence J. Epstein states that Sweet Lorraine captured the nostalgia of the Catskill resorts more authentically compared to Dirty Dancing, and that the Lorraine "transcends the location to become a metaphor for what humans should do with their own pasts." In Irwin Richman's book Catskill Hotels, Sweet Lorraine is described as an "exceptional movie about Catskill hotel life".

New York Magazine described the film as a comedy.

References

External links 
 
 
 
 

1987 films
1987 directorial debut films
1987 independent films
1980s English-language films
American independent films
Borscht Belt
Films directed by Steve Gomer
Films set in New York (state)
1980s American films
Films set in resorts
Films shot in New York (state)